The Haughty Princess (A rátartós királykisasszony) is an operetta by the  Hungarian composer Victor Jacobi. As his first operetta it was premiered on December 17, 1904 in Budapest. The libretto is by Jenő Heltai, who rewrote a folk tale by Holger Drachmann.

References

Operas by Victor Jacobi
Hungarian-language operettas
1904 operas
Operas
Holger Drachmann